1st Supreme People's Assembly may refer to:

 1st Supreme People's Assembly of Laos, 1975–89
 1st Supreme People's Assembly of North Korea, 1948–1957